N,N,N′,N′-Tetramethylformamidinium chloride is the simplest representative of quaternary formamidinium cations of the general formula [R2N−CH=NR2]+ with a chloride as a counterion in which all hydrogen atoms of the protonated formamidine [HC(=NH2)NH2]+ are replaced by methyl groups.

Deprotonation results in the exceptionally basic bis(dimethylamino)carbene R2N−C̈−NR2.

Preparation 
It is generated by protonation of (CH3)3COCH(N(CH3)2)2 (Bredereck's reagent).

(CH3)3COCH(N(CH3)2)2  +  H+  →  (CH3)3COH  +  [CH(N(CH3)2)2]+

N,N,N′,N′-Tetramethylformamidinium chloride is also obtained in high yield (95%) in the reaction of dimethylformamide (DMF) with dimethylcarbamoyl chlorideThe conversion of DMF with thionyl chloride in a ratio of 3:1 obtains the product in a is significantly lower yield (72%) which appears, however, more realistic in view of the tricky handling of the chloride salt.

Properties 
N,N,N′,N′-Tetramethylformamidinium chloride is a light yellow, strongly hygroscopic solid.

For drying, the salt is dissolved in dichloromethane and the solution is treated with solid anhydrous sodium sulfate. After several dissolutions in dichloromethane and acetone, and precipitations with tetrahydrofuran, a colorless solid is obtained, which is stable under air and moisture sealing.

The presumption of a mesomeric equilibrium between ionic formamidinium chloride and covalent bis(dimethylamino)chloromethane structure:

could be decided by reaction with germanium dichloride or tin(II) chloride in favour of the presence of N,N,N′,N′-tetramethylformamidinium chloride.

The hygroscopy of the chloride salt complicates the handling of the compound. Therefore, also syntheses of the much better processible salts N,N,N′,N′-tetramethylformamidinium methylsulfate (from the dimethylformamide–dimethylsulfate complex) and of N,N,N′,N′-tetramethylformamidinium p-toluenesulfonate (from dimethylformamide and p-toluenesulfonyl chloride) were investigated.

Applications 
N,N,N′,N′-Tetramethylformamidinium chloride is useful as a reagent for aminomethylenation (that is, to introduce a =CH−NR1R2 function to CH-acidic compounds). For example, ethyl cyanoacetate reacts with the formamidinium salt in the presence of solid sodium hydroxide to give ethyl (dimethylaminomethylene)cyanoacetate in practically quantitative yields.

The aminomethylenation provides intermediates for the synthesis of heterocycles such as indoles, pyrimidines, pyridines and quinolones.

N,N,N′,N′-Tetramethylformamidinium chloride reacts with alkali metal dimethylamides (such as lithium dimethylamide or sodium dimethylamide) to tris(dimethylamino)methane in yields of 55% to 84%.

The reaction product is suited as a reagent for formylation and aminomethylenation.

From N,N,N′,N′-tetramethylformamidinium chloride and sodium ethoxide in ethanol, dimethylformamide diethyl acetal is formed in 68% yield.

In aqueous sodium cyanide, N,N,N′,N′-tetramethylformamidinium reacts to bis(dimethylamino)acetonitrile.

From N,N,N′,N′-tetramethylformamidinium and anhydrous hydrogen cyanide, dimethylaminomalonic acid dinitrile is obtained in 92% yield.

N,N,N′,N′-Tetramethylformamidinium can be regaminated with cyclo-aliphatic amines to the corresponding heterocyclic formamidines.

N,N,N′,N′-tetramethylformamidinium is a catalyst in the preparation of acyl chlorides from carboxylic acids and phosgene has been reported.

Strong bases (such as phenyllithium) can abstract a proton from the formamidinium cation of N,N,N′,N′-tetramethylformamidinium forming bis(dimethylamino)carbene.

See also
Bis(dimethylamino)methane

References 

Amidines
Dimethylamino compounds